The Hornet was a British boys' comic published by D. C. Thomson & Co. for 648 issues from 14 September 1963 to 7 February 1976, after which it was merged with The Hotspur. The free gift with the first issue was a balsa wood "Kestral Glider".

Notable strips and characters
 The Blazing Ace of Spades - starring Richard Starr, a ruthless World War II fighter pilot
 V for Vengeance (1965–75; 1976–80 The Hotspur) - starring the Deathless Men, masked concentration camp escapees who first appeared in prose format in The Wizard in 1942.
 William Wilson, first appeared in prose format in The Wizard in 1943, appeared in picture form in The Hornet starting on 12 September 1964.

References

External links
 The Hornet at the Grand Comics Database
 Adrian Banfield, A brief history of The Victor - (1961- 1992, published every Monday), 2008.
 Adrian Banfield, The Hornet Index, April 2010.

DC Thomson Comics titles
Comics magazines published in the United Kingdom
1963 comics debuts
1976 comics endings
Defunct British comics
Magazines established in 1963
Magazines disestablished in 1976